Farewell to the Ark (translit. Saraba hakobune) is a 1984 Japanese mystery film directed by Shūji Terayama, loosely based on the novel One Hundred Years of Solitude. It was entered into the 1985 Cannes Film Festival.

Cast
 Tsutomu Yamazaki - Sutekichi Tokito
 Mayumi Ogawa - Sue Tokito
 Yoshio Harada - Daisaki Tokito
 Yôko Takahashi - Temari
 Eisei Amamoto - Key maker
 Renji Ishibashi - Yonetaro Tokito
 Hosei Komatsu
 Seiji Miyaguchi - Old man
 Keiko Niitaka - Tsubana
 Hitomi Takahashi - Chigusa
 Takeshi Wakamatsu - Dai

References

External links

1984 films
1980s mystery films
1980s Japanese-language films
Films directed by Shūji Terayama
Films based on works by Gabriel García Márquez
1980s Japanese films